Giovanni Fulco (1615-c. 1680) was an Italian painter of the Baroque period.

Biography
He was born in Messina. After having learned the first principles of design there, he went to Naples, where he entered the school of Cavalière Massimo Stanzione. He excelled particularly in the representation of children. Many of his pictures have been destroyed by the earthquakes. Of those that remain are his fresco works and a canvas on oil of the Birth of the Virgin in the chapel of the Crucifixion at the Nunziata de'Teatini at Messina. During 1674–79, he frescoed the choir of the church of Santi Pietro e Paolo in Acireale, presently somewhat restored. He died in poverty in Rome.

References

1615 births
1680s deaths
Painters from Messina
17th-century Italian painters
Italian male painters
Painters from Naples
Italian Baroque painters